Manchukuo was a puppet state set up by the Empire of Japan in Manchuria which existed from 1931 to 1945. The Manchukuo regime was established four months after the Japanese withdrawal from Shanghai with Puyi as the nominal but powerless head of state to add some semblance of legitimacy, as he was a former emperor and an ethnic Manchu.

Government 
Manchukuo was proclaimed a monarchy on 1 March 1934, with former Qing dynasty emperor Puyi assuming the Manchukuo throne under the reign name of Emperor Kang-de. An imperial rescript issued the same day, promulgated the organic law of the new state, establishing a Privy Council, a Legislative Council and the General Affairs State Council to "advise and assist the emperor in the discharge of his duties". The Privy Council was an appointive body consisting of Puyi's closest friends and confidants, and the Legislative Council was largely an honorary body without authority. The State Council was therefore the center of political power in Manchukuo. The organic law was largely an abridged version of the Imperial Japanese Constitution, with an important difference being the lack of any mention of civil rights and the increased authority of the Privy Council. As with all other aspects of Manchukuo, the government was purely ceremonial and existed to authenticate the puppet state rather than to rule the people of Manchukuo. True authority remained in the hands of the Kwantung Army.

Composition

Political parties and movements 
During his administration, the Kangde Emperor, in an interview with foreign journalists, mentioned his interest in forming a political party with Confucian doctrines. The Japanese "native" establishment, however, organized some right-wing and nationalist parties, in the Shōwa militarist mould. Such movements, which had official status, were:

Concordia Association (State-sponsored political party)
Northeast Administrative Committee (Manchukuo nationalist local party)
White Russian Fascist Party (later the Russian Fascist Party; White Russian anti-communist party in Manchukuo, used the swastika as the party symbol, and guided by a Russian fascist "Duce")
Bureau for Russian Emigrants in Manchuria (BREM) led by General Vladimir Kislitsin
Monarquic Party (White Russian Tsarist Monarchic party with Japanese approval)
Betarim Jew Zionist Movement (Jewish rights movement in Manchukuo)
Far Eastern Jewish Council (Jewish Zionist council in Harbin, Manchukuo led by Dr. Abraham Kaufman, with Japanese Army support)

Notable people

The Imperial Manchu Court 

 Aisin Gioro Henry Puyi (Kangde Emperor and head of state)
 Madame Wanrong (Empress and first wife of the Kangde Emperor)
 Prince Aisin Gioro Pujie (brother of Puyi, possible heir of Manchukuo Throne)
 Prince Aisin Gioro Puren (brother of Puyi)
 Prince Aisin Gioro Yuyan (nephew of Puyi)
 Hiro Saga (Japanese sister-in-law of the Kangde Emperor)
 Wenxiu (first concubine of the Emperor)
 Tan Yuling (2nd Wife of the Kangde Emperor)
 Li Yuqin (4th Wife of the Kangde Emperor)
 Princess Aisin Gioro Huisheng (daughter of Pu-Chieh and Hiro Saga)
 Princess Aisin Gioro Xianyu (distant relative)

Others (local) 
 Bao Guancheng, Manchukuo's first ambassador in Tokyo 
 Yuan Cheng-Tse, Manchukuo ambassador in Tokyo
 Li Shao-Keng, Manchukuo ambassador in Tokyo
 Gen. Tinge, Manchukuo diplomat in Tokyo
 Lu Yiwen, Manchukuo ambassador in Berlin

Kwantung Army 

Commanders

Chief of Staff
Koji Miyake (10 August 1928 – 8 August 1932)
Kuniaki Koiso (8 August 1932 – 5 March 1934)
Juzo Nishio (5 March 1934 – 23 March 1936)
Seishirō Itagaki (23 March 1936 – 1 March 1937)
Hideki Tōjō (1 March 1937 – 30 May 1938)
Rensuke Isogai (18 June 1938 – 7 September 1939)
Jo Iimura (7 September 1939 – 22 October 1940)
Heitarō Kimura (22 October 1940 – 10 April 1941)
Teiichi Yoshimoto (10 April 1941 – 1 August 1942)
Yukio Kasahara (1 August 1942 – 7 April 1945)
Hikosaburo Hata (7 April 1945 – 11 August 1945)

Others (Japanese) 
 Nobusuke Kishi, Deputy Minister of Industrial Development, architect of the exploitative slave economy in Manchukuo, war criminal and later post-war Prime Minister of Japan
 Chu Kudo, Chamberlain, aide-de-camp to Emperor Puyi
 Yoshioka Yasunori Army senior staff officer and Attaché to the Imperial Household in Manchukuo
 Kenjiro Hayashide official Kangde emperor biographer and author of "Epochal Journey to Japan"
 Chiune Sugihara, Vice Foreign Minister
 Hoshino Naoki, Vice Minister of Finance
 Kenji Doihara, Japanese spymaster and military commander
 Norihiro Yasue, Army officer, author of the Fugu Plan
 Koreshige Inuzuka, Navy officer, co-author of the Fugu Plan
 Masahiko Amakasu, Vice Minister of Civil Affairs and head of Manchukuo Film Association
 Yoshisuke Aikawa, prominent industrialist
 Tatsunosuke Takasaki, prominent businessman
 Toranosuke Hashimoto, State Shinto head priest
 Yanagida Genzo Commander, Kwantung Defense Command
 Takashi Hishikari Kwantung Army ambassador to Manchukuo. 
 Kimio Miyagawa  Japanese Consul-general in Harbin
 Funao Miyakawa Japanese General Counselor in Vladivostok and then in Harbin
 Prince Fumitaka Konoe Army Senior Lieutenant, son and personal secretary of Prince Fumimaro Konoe
 Shun Akifusa Chief of military Mission in Harbin and political adviser to the white Russian political groups in same city
 Genzo Yanagita head of the Japanese military mission in Harbin
 Kenji Ishikawa head of a sabotage group of that mission
 Yutaka Takeoka intelligence officer and head of the Dairen military mission
 Saburo Asada head of the 2nd (Intelligence) department of the staff of the Kwantung Army
 Tamaki Kumazaki deputy chief of intelligence of Kwantung Army
 Hiroki Nohara deputy chief of Kwantung Army Intelligence
 Yoshio Itagaki deputy chief of Kwantung Army Intelligence and son of Seishiro Itagaki, war minister from 1938–1939

Others 
 Genrikh Lyushkov, ex-Soviet Far East NKVD defector, adviser to Kwantung Army
 Konstantin Vladimirovich Rodzaevsky, White Russian anticommunist leader
 General Kislitsin, another White Russian anticommunist chief
 Abraham Kaufman, founder of Far Eastern Jewish Council and Betarim Jew Zionists Movement
 Trebitsch Lincoln, Hungarian pro-Japanese collaborator
 August Ponschab, German consul in Harbin, Manchuria
 Auguste Ernest Pierre Gaspais, Vatican representative in Harbin, Manchuria
 Charles Lemaire, Vatican diplomatic officer in Harbin, Manchuria
 Lian Yu, ambassador from the Japanese-sponsored Nanjing Nationalist Government 
 Mariano Amoedo Galarmendi, Spanish chargé d'affaires to 1939
 Fernando Valdés Ibargüen, Count of Torata, Spanish minister 1941 to 1942
 José González de Gregorio y Arribas, Spanish chargé d'affaires 1942 to 1943, commercial attaché since 1940

References